Basil Maine  (4 March 1894 - 13 October 1972) was an English writer and critic on music. Maine was born in Sheringham, Norfolk and educated at the City of Norwich School. At Cambridge he studied with Edward Dent, Cyril Rootham and Charles Wood. In the autumn of 1918 he was appointed assistant organist at Durham Cathedral, staying there until May 1919. After that he shifted his career towards journalism, becoming music critic for newspapers such as The Spectator, The Daily Telegraph (from 1922), the Morning Post (1930) and the Sunday Times (1935–40). He was also an actor, public speaker and (from 1926) a broadcaster. In 1930 he was the orator in the first performance of Morning Heroes by Arthur Bliss at the Norwich Festival. and he also narrated in performances of Honegger's Le roi David and Stravinsky's The Soldier's Tale. He was ordained as a priest in 1939.

Maine wrote biography as well as music criticism. His early volume Behold these Daniels consists of 12 character sketches of critics (including the author) that originally appeared in Musical Times columns in 1926–7. The sketches include Ernest Newman, Edwin Evans, Robin Legge and H.C.Colles. The two-volume Elgar: his Life and Works, published a year before the subject's death, is his best-known work. Our Ambassador King is now a curiosity - a biography of King Edward VIII written before the abdication, with no mention of Mrs Simpson. The Best of Me, completed in 1937, is autobiographical and Twang with our Music (from 1957) is a collection of essays marking "the completion of 30 years' practice in the uncertain science of music criticism".

Selected writings

 Receive It So (1926)
 Behold these Daniels: being Studies of Contemporary Music Critics (1928)
 The Divisions of Music (as editor, 1930)
 Reflected Music and Other Essays (1930)
 Rondo (novel, 1930, dedicated to Anna May Wong)
 Plummer's Cut (novel, 1932)
 Elgar: his Life and Works (1933)
 Chopin (1933, second edition 1949)
 'Paderewski' (in Great Contemporaries: Essays by Various Hands, 1935)
 Our Ambassador King (1936)
 The Best of Me: A Study in Autobiography (1937)
 The Glory of English Music (1937)
 Franklin Roosevelt His Life And Achievement (1938)
 People are Much Alike (autobiography, 1938)
 The BBC and its Audience (1939)
 New Paths in Music (1940)
 Basil Maine on Music (1945)
 Twang with our Music (1957)

References

1894 births
1972 deaths
British music critics
English music critics